HMS Cavendish has been the name of two Royal Navy ships:

, a Hawkins-class cruiser built in 1918, renamed HMS Vindictive, and converted to an aircraft carrier
, a C-class destroyer built in 1944

Royal Navy ship names